The 1938 New Zealand general election was a nationwide vote to determine the shape of the New Zealand Parliament's 26th term. It resulted in the governing Labour Party being re-elected, although the newly founded National Party gained a certain amount of ground.

This was the first election in which the Māori were given a secret ballot which had been available to white voters since 1870.

Background
The Labour Party had won a resounding victory in the 1935 elections, winning fifty-three seats. Shortly after the elections, the two Ratana-aligned MPs also merged into the Labour Party, giving Labour a total of fifty-five seats. The government, a coalition of the United Party and the Reform Party, had won only nineteen seats. Shortly after their defeat, United and Reform agreed to merge into the National Party, which positioned itself as the only alternative to the "socialist" Labour Party. However, Labour remained popular with the public, and the Prime Minister, Michael Joseph Savage, was widely praised for his welfare reform. The leadership of the National Party, by contrast, was closely associated by the public with the Great Depression, and struggled to gain traction.

The election
The date for the main 1938 elections was 15 October, a Saturday. Elections to the four Maori electorates were held the day before. 995,173 people were registered to vote, and there was a turnout of 92.9%. This turnout was the highest ever recorded at that point, although it was later exceeded in the two elections after World War II and in the 1984 elections. The number of seats being contested was 80, a number which had been fixed since 1902.

Results
The 1938 election saw a decisive win for the governing Labour Party, which won fifty-three seats. This was a drop of two from what it held prior to the election. While Labour gained the seats of Bay of Islands, Motueka (previously held by Keith Holyoake), New Plymouth, Wellington Suburbs, and Northern Maori, it lost Tauranga and the rural seats of Manawatu, Rangitikei, Waikato, Mid-Canterbury, and Waipawa.

The National Party won twenty-five seats, an increase of six from that the United–Reform Coalition had previously won. Both Labour and National increased their share of the popular vote, with Labour winning 55.8% (up from 46.1%) and National winning 40.3% (up from 32.9%). This increase was at the expense of the Democrat Party (who had merged into National in 1936) and the agrarian monetary reformist Country Party, which saw its votes collapse completely. The Country Party lost the two seats it held ( and ) as, unlike 1935, Labour stood candidates in the seats held by the two Country Party members. Hence Harold Rushworth did not stand in the Bay of Islands seat, and Arthur Sexton came third in Franklin.

Independent candidates also lost ground, with only two being elected, Harry Atmore and Charles Wilkinson. As in 1935, the independents were tactically supported by one of the major parties who did not stand a candidate against them, and they generally voted with that party; Wilkinson and Wright had supported National while Atmore had supported Labour.  But Robert Wright was defeated for the new electorate of Wellington West by Labour despite National not running a candidate against him.

An analysis of men and women on the rolls against the votes recorded showed that in the 1938 election 92.85% of those on the European rolls voted; men 93.43% and women 92.27%. In the  the figures were 90.75% with men 92.02% and women 89.46%. As the Māori electorates did not have electoral rolls they could not be included.

This was the first election in which the Māori were given a secret ballot. Secret ballots had been available to white voters since 1870, but it was not extended to Māori voters until the 1937 Electoral Amendment Act was passed. The number of votes cast in the Māori seats in the 1938 election rose 18.3% from the 1935 election. Opponents of the secret ballot for the Māori claimed that the Māori suffered from illiteracy, but only 2.28% of the ballots were ruled invalid. Member of Parliament Eruera Tirikatene praised the secret ballot for the Māori as he regarded it as one of the rights promised in the Treaty of Waitangi.

Party standings

*includes two Ratana MPs (Toko Ratana, Eruera Tirikatene) who joined the Labour caucus after the 1935 election

Votes summary

Electorate results
The following table shows the detailed results:

Key

|-
 |colspan=8 style="background-color:#FFDEAD" | General electorates
|-

|-
 | Hauraki
 | style="background-color:;" |
 | style="text-align:center;" | Robert Coulter
 | style="background-color:;" |
 | style="text-align:center;background-color:;" | John Manchester Allen
 | style="text-align:right;" | 1,188
 | style="background-color:;" |
 | style="text-align:center;" | Robert Coulter
|-

|-
 |colspan=8 style="background-color:#FFDEAD" | Māori electorates
|-

|}

References

Other sources